Sela Tunnel is an under-construction road tunnel at  which will ensure all-weather connectivity between Guwahati in Assam and Tawang in the Indian state of Arunachal Pradesh. The tunnel is being excavated below the  Sela Pass in India on NH 13 component of Trans-Arunachal Highway system. It will be connected with NH 13 by a new 12.4 km road and will reduce the distance between Dirang and Tawang by 10 km. It has a 3-year target completion date of February 2022 after the construction commenced in 2019. The tunnel will provide access to Tawang by an all-weather road in the western region of Arunachal Pradesh throughout the year.

The project provides for two tunnels of 1,790 m and 475 m lengths and an escape tube of 980 m. Raksha Mantri Shri Rajnath Singh witnessed the breakthrough of Sela Tunnel  in the Month of Sep 2021 and Dedicated it to the Nation. It was a Mile stone for BRO and commitment towards connecting even the remotest part of the Nation.

Location 

The Sela Tunnel cuts through the Sela–Charbela ridge, which separates the Tawang district from the West Kameng district (Dirang Circle). It is located a few kilometres to the west of the Sela Pass. It avoids the winter snowfalls on the Sela Pass in addition to cutting down the travel time to Tawang by an hour.

The project in fact involves two tunnels. The two tunnels together bypass the Sela Pass and maintain an elevation of 3000 m.

Strategic importance
This strategic tunnel is being constructed by the Border Roads Organisation (BRO) under Project Vartak. It will enhance Indian military's capabilities in combating the threat of China's Western Theater Command opposite India's eastern sector of Line of Actual Control. It will cut the travel time from the Indian Army's IV Corps headquarter at Tezpur to Tawang by at least 10 km or 1 hour and also help make the NH13 an all-weather road to access Tawang which usually gets disconnected during winter. The tunnels would ensure that the 171 km road between Bomdila and Tawang remains accessible in all weather conditions.

The BRO is also improving the road from Sangestar Tso (north of Tawang) to Bum La Pass on India-China Line of Actual Control (disputed parts of McMahon Line).  NH13 has been converted to 2-lane road.

Sela pass is located at 4,200 m but the two tunnels are located at the height of 3,000 m (10,000 feet). The tunnel cuts through Sela-Chabrela ridge. A new greenfield road 12.37 km long from the tunnel will meet the existing Balipara-Chaudur-Tawang road on the Nurarang side and the hairpin bends to the Sela Pass will be avoided. The tunnel constructed using the latest New Austrian Tunneling Method (NATM) is much below the snow line allowing all weather travel without the challenges of snow clearance.

The tunnel will add to the tourist potential of Tawang and attract more tourists making Tawang a more popular destination in North East region.

Status updates
 February 2018: Project announced in 2018-19 union budget. 
 February 2019: Foundation stone laid by Prime Minister Narendra Modi. Tunnel to be ready in three years by February 2022.
 September 2019: Construction of approach road was ongoing and tunnel boring commenced by month end.
 September 2020: Arunachal Pradesh Chief Minister Pema Khandu, inspected the progress of the work on 4 September 2020 and said that "Happy to notice the work progress, all work will be completed by end of 2021."
 July 2021: Excavation of the 980 m escape tube was completed in July 2021. This will facilitate faster completion of Sela Tunnel by undertaking simultaneous activities in two-way tube of 1,555 m besides 8.8 km of approach roads.

See also

 India-China Border Roads
 Bhalukpong-Tawang railway, under-construction 
 Arunachal Frontier Highway, proposed along Indo-China LOC in upper Arunachal Pradesh 
 East-West Industrial Corridor Highway, proposed in lower foothills of Arunachal Pradesh
 Northeast Connectivity projects
 Look-East Connectivity projects

References

Road tunnels in Arunachal Pradesh
Proposed road infrastructure in India
Buildings and structures under construction in India
Tawang district
West Kameng district